The canton of Chartres-2 is an administrative division of the Eure-et-Loir department, northern France. It was created at the French canton reorganisation which came into effect in March 2015. Its seat is in Chartres.

It consists of the following communes:
 
Berchères-les-Pierres
La Bourdinière-Saint-Loup
Chartres (partly)
Corancez
Le Coudray
Dammarie
Fresnay-le-Comte
Gellainville
Mignières
Morancez
Nogent-le-Phaye
Prunay-le-Gillon
Sours
Thivars
Ver-lès-Chartres

References

Cantons of Eure-et-Loir